The 1966 United States Senate election in Texas was held on November 8, 1966. Incumbent Republican U.S. Senator John Tower was re-elected to a second term in office over Democratic Attorney General of Texas Waggoner Carr.

Democratic primary

Candidates
Waggoner Carr, Attorney General of Texas
John R. Willoughby, resident of Houston

Results

General election

Candidates
John G. Tower, incumbent U.S. Senator since 1961

Results

References

Texas
1966
1966 Texas elections